The Olive Tree was a denomination used for several successive centre-left political and electoral alliances of  Italian political parties from 1995 to 2007.

The historical leader and ideologue of these coalitions was Romano Prodi, Professor of Economics and former leftist Christian Democrat, who invented the name and the symbol of The Olive Tree with Arturo Parisi in 1995. For the 2006 general election The Olive Tree was largely supplanted by a wider Prodi-led alliance  called The Union, while The Olive Tree remained a smaller federation of parties which merged to form the Democratic Party in October 2007, which continues to be the lead party of an unnamed centre-left coalition.

History

The Olive Tree coalition

In government with Prodi (1996–1998)
On 21 April 1996, The Olive Tree won 1996 general election in alliance with the Communist Refoundation Party (PRC), making Romano Prodi the Prime Minister of Italy. It was the first time since 1946 that the Communists, now gathered in the Democratic Party of the Left, took part in the government of the country and one of their leaders, Walter Veltroni, who ran in ticket with Prodi in a long electoral campaign, was Deputy Prime Minister.

In 1996 the coalition was formed by the following parties:

Besides the external support of PRC, the coalition received the support also of some minor parties: the Italian Republican Party (PRI, social-liberal), The Network (social-liberal), the South Tyrolean People's Party (regionalist) and some other minor parties which later merged with PDS.

From D'Alema to Rutelli (1998–2004)
On 9 October 1998, the Prodi I Cabinet fell when PRC left the alliance. Since 21 October 1998 The Olive Tree was the core of the governments led by Massimo D'Alema (I and II Cabinet, 1998–2000) and by Giuliano Amato (II Cabinet, 2000–2001). When D'Alema became Prime Minister, it was the first time ever in Italy and in Europe that an heir of the communist tradition came to lead a government.

On 13 May 2001, led by Francesco Rutelli, who ran in ticket with Piero Fassino, the coalition lost the general elections against Silvio Berlusconi and his  House of Freedoms centre-right coalition. In the 2001 general election, the coalition was composed of six parties:

The Olive Tree list and federation
On 12 June 2004, The Olive Tree, as United in the Olive Tree (Uniti nell'Ulivo), ran in the European Parliament election gaining 31.1% of popular votes. The Olive Tree of 2004 was a tighter alliance of only four parties:

On 13 September 2004, The Olive Tree was transformed in the Federation of The Olive Tree, consisting of same four parties that campaigned together in the European elections that summer. Romano Prodi, who came back to politics in that year, after five years of President of the European Commission, was elected President of the federation, which was to become the core of a larger centre-left coalition.

On 10 February 2005, the name and logo of that larger electoral coalition was presented. Its name was The Union (L'Unione). It comprised the Federation of The Olive Tree, the Communist Refoundation Party (PRC), the Party of Italian Communists (PdCI), Italy of Values (IdV), the Federation of the Greens and other minor parties.

Democratic Party
The Democrats of the Left (DS), Democracy is Freedom – The Daisy (DL) and the European Republicans Movement (MRE) decided to form a joint electoral list for the 2006 Italian general election. Also the Italian Democratic Socialist Party (a different party from SDI) and The Italian Socialists had candidates in the list. The Italian Democratic Socialists (SDI), which were part of the federation and fight the 2004 European and the 2005 regional elections within it, decided not to take part of the joint electoral list for the 2006 general election and, otherwise, to form a common list with the Italian Radicals called Rose in the Fist within The Union coalition.

DS and DL were heavily involved in the foundation of a new unitary centre-left party, the Democratic Party, a project strongly supported by Romano Prodi since his entrance into politics in 1995. This party was founded on 14 October 2007 and Walter Veltroni was elected party leader by voters in an open primary.

Electoral results

Italian Parliament

European Parliament

Symbols

Further reading

See also
 Centre-left coalition

References

External links

Italy's Olive Tree (1996), article by The Nation

1995 establishments in Italy
2007 disestablishments in Italy
Defunct political party alliances in Italy
History of the Communist Refoundation Party
Political parties established in 1995
Political parties disestablished in 2007
Romano Prodi